Beer Lovers Party may refer to:
Beer Lovers Party (Belarus)
Polish Beer-Lovers' Party
Beer Lovers Party (Russia)
Beer Lovers Party (Ukraine)